Simply the Best may refer to:

Music
 Simply the Best (Art Garfunkel album), 1998
 Simply the Best (Crystal Lewis album)
 Simply the Best (Tina Turner album), 1991
 "The Best" (song), also known as "Simply the Best", a 1988 song recorded by Bonnie Tyler and later covered by Tina Turner
 "Simply the Best" (song), 2022
 Simply the Best, a 2006 mixtape by Scorcher
 "Simply the Best", from the television series Schitt's Creek, covered by Noah Reid

Other uses
 Simply the Best (game show), a British game show